Fort Sill Indian School was an American Indian boarding school near Lawton, Comanche County, Oklahoma, United States. The school opened in 1871, with 24 students in the first year, had 300 students in the 1970s, and closed in 1980 although "Native students and administrators, alumni, and Indian leaders fought tenaciously to keep the school alive when the BIA announced its imminent closure". It was founded by Quakers but became nonsectarian in 1891.  

Building 309 of the school is recorded on the National Register of Historic Places, #73001559.

The British Museum holds a collection of 91 photographs taken in the 1990s identified as "Photographs taken for a news story for the Daily Oklahoman on the planned re-opening of the school as a Native American College".

Notable alumni
Doc Tate Nevaquaya (1932-1996), musician
Robert Redbird (1939-2016), artist
Charles Chibitty (1921-2005), World War II code talker

References

Native American boarding schools
School buildings on the National Register of Historic Places in Oklahoma
Defunct schools in Oklahoma
Boarding schools in Oklahoma
Educational institutions established in 1871
Educational institutions disestablished in 1980
National Register of Historic Places in Comanche County, Oklahoma
Native American history of Oklahoma